Miklós Malek (born 3 June 1945, in Budapest, Hungary) is a Hungarian award winning  composer and conductor. He has won many awards: Táncdalfesztivál - Hangszerelési díj (1969), Lyra-díj (1994), Fényes Szabolcs-díj (1996), EMeRTon-díj (2000), Erkel Ferenc-díj (2004) and Artisjus Életmű-díj (2004)

He was admitted to the Franz Liszt Academy of Music where he graduated in 1970 obtaining the diploma after studying classical music. He joined Angyalföldi Dixieland Zenekar orchestra in 1963 and from 1969 onwards, he worked for two decades as band composer-arranger including from 1969 with Magyar Rádió (Hungarian Radio). 

From 1983 he worked as a musical director, including starting 1992 until 1999 with Magyar Televízió (Hungarian television). He worked with many artists including Géza Hofi, Kati Kovács, Zorán, János Koós, Caterina Valenté, Harold Faltermeyer, Helen Schneider and Al Di Meola among others. 

As a composer of popular music, he has covered a number of important orchestral, symphonic pieces. In addition to his compositions, he has arranged for and conducted on many musical works, albums and singles.

Personal life
He is married to Mária Toldy, a pop singer and has two children, Andrea, a singer and actress, and Miklós Malek, a successful musician, a songwriter and producer and judge / mentor in the Hungarian X-Faktor.

Works
Orchestral pieces
1974: Hívogató
1978: Angyalföld
1978: Kicsik és nagyok
1981: Ha felszáll a köd
1982: Téli mese
1983: Lepketánc
1984: Elégia
1985: Éjfél után
1986: Pas de deux
1987: Újpesti orgonák
1990: Walzer
Symphonic works
1998: Trombitaverseny
2000: Kürtverseny
2002: Harsonaverseny
2003: Carmen (adaptation)
2004: Quo vadis - Concerto for Strings

References

External links
Miklós Malek on Discogs

Hungarian composers
Hungarian male composers
1945 births
Living people
Eurovision Song Contest conductors